NA-128 may refer to:
 NA-128 (Lahore-VI), a constituency for the National Assembly of Pakistan
 NA-128 (Lahore-XI), a former constituency for the National Assembly of Pakistan